= Brad Garfield =

- Born: June 18, 1967 (age 58)
- Occupation: Television director
- Known for: Covering the Atlanta and Sydney Olympics, artistic director of Bendheim Performing Arts Center of J.C.C. of Mid-Westchester in Scarsdale

Brad Garfield (born June 18, 1967) is a television director who won two Emmys for his role as part of the team covering the Atlanta and Sydney Olympics for NBC. In 2005, he became artistic director of Bendheim Performing Arts Center of J.C.C. of Mid-Westchester in Scarsdale.

== Background ==
Garfield was born on June 18, to Ralph Garfield, a child actor and then businessman in Los Angeles, and Sandra, a stay at home mother. Garfield has three siblings (two sisters and a brother).

He attended Granada Hills High School and went to UCLA before enlisting in the Marines. He went back to college and attended, Cal State University Northridge where he graduated with a BA in Theatre and also played baseball. He played 1-season with the San Diego Padre's Single A Team before he began his career in the entertainment industry working Re-known Rock and Roll Band, The Doors on the 1-hour video project, "Dance On Fire,"
